Eleutherascus is a genus of fungi in the family Ascodesmidaceae. It was described by mycologist Josef Adolf von Arx in 1971.

References

Pezizales
Pezizales genera